Progress M1-9, identified by NASA as Progress 9P, was a Progress spacecraft used to resupply the International Space Station. It was a Progress-M1 11F615A55 spacecraft, with the serial number 258.

Launch
Progress M1-9 was launched by a Soyuz-FG carrier rocket from Site 1/5 at the Baikonur Cosmodrome. Launch occurred at 16:58:24 UTC on 25 September 2002.

Docking
The spacecraft docked with the aft port of the Zvezda module at 17:00:54 UTC on 29 September 2002. It remained docked for 125 days before undocking at 16:00:54 GMT on 1 February 2003. to make way for Progress M-47 It was deorbited at 19:10:00 UTC on the same day, burning up in the atmosphere over the Pacific Ocean just six hours after the  had disintegrated over Texas. Any remaining debris from Progress M1-9 landed in the ocean at around 20:00:28 UTC.

Progress M1-9 carried supplies to the International Space Station, including food, water and oxygen for the crew and equipment for conducting scientific research.

See also

 List of Progress flights
 Uncrewed spaceflights to the International Space Station

References

Progress (spacecraft) missions
Supply vehicles for the International Space Station
Spacecraft launched in 2002
Spacecraft which reentered in 2003
Spacecraft launched by Soyuz-FG rockets